This is the list of awards and nominations received by the Coen brothers (Joel Coen and Ethan Coen).

Awards

Academy Awards 
Joel Coen and Ethan Coen have each been nominated for a total of fourteen Academy Awards (twice under their alias “Roderick Jaynes”) and have won four, including two for screenwriting (Best Original Screenplay for Fargo and Best Adapted Screenplay for No Country for Old Men), one for Best Director (No Country for Old Men), and one for Best Picture (No Country for Old Men). Twelve of their nominations were joint, but each received an individual nomination for Fargo (Joel for Best Director and Ethan for Best Picture) – thus the brothers have fifteen combined nominations.

They are two of only nine filmmakers with three Oscars for the same film. The others are James L. Brooks for Terms of Endearment (1983), James Cameron for Titanic (1997), Francis Ford Coppola for The Godfather Part II (1974), Alejandro G. Iñárritu for Birdman or (The Unexpected Virtue of Ignorance) (2014), Peter Jackson for The Lord of the Rings: The Return of the King (2003), Billy Wilder for The Apartment (1960), Alfonso Cuarón for Roma and Bong Joon-ho for Parasite (Cuarón and Bong's films both won Best International Feature Film).

Best Picture

Best Director

Best Original Screenplay

Best Adapted Screenplay

Best Editing (as Roderick Jaynes)

Golden Globe Awards

Best Motion Picture – Musical or Comedy

Best Motion Picture – Drama

Best Director

Best Screenplay

Best Original Song

BAFTA Awards

Best Film

Best Direction

Best Original Screenplay

Best Adapted Screenplay

Best Editing (as Roderick Jaynes)

Primetime Emmy Awards

Critics Choice Movie Awards

Best Picture

Best Comedy

Best Director

Best Screenplay

Directors Guild of America Awards

Producers Guild of America Awards

Writers Guild of America Awards

Best Original Screenplay

Best Adapted Screenplay

Independent Spirit Awards

Saturn Awards

Best Action or Adventure Film

Best Independent Film

Best Director

Best Writing

Cannes Film Festival

Palme d'Or

Best Director
The awards were given to Joel Coen

Cannes Grand Prix

Venice Film Festival

Golden Osella for Best Screenplay

National Board of Review

Best Director

Best Original Screenplay

Best Adapted Screenplay

Best Film

National Society of Film Critics

Best Director

Best Screenplay

Best Film

New York Film Critics Circle

Best Director

Best Screenplay

Los Angeles Film Critics Association

Best Director

Best Screenplay

London Film Critics Circle

Director of the Year

Screenwriter of the Year

Chicago Film Critics Association

Best Director

Best Screenplay

Best Original Screenplay

Best Adapted Screenplay

References

Lists of awards received by writer
Lists of awards received by film director